Jonas Elrod, born February 1, 1972, is an American writer, director, and producer for television and film. His documentary, Wake Up, tracked Elrod as he went in search for understanding and deeper meaning after undergoing a spiritual awakening. 
His film opened at South By Southwest Film Festival and would become the premiere episode for Oprah Winfrey's award-winning Super Soul Sunday. Elrod went on to create and star in the series In Deep Shift with Jonas Elrod for the Oprah Winfrey Network.

References

External links
 

1972 births
Living people